Cécile Bois (born 26 December 1971) is a French actress originally from Lormont, Gironde.

Biography 
While at school, Bois joined an amateur theatre troupe. The following year, she entered the Conservatoire de Bordeaux which she subsequently left to join another theatre group named "".

At age 19, Bois moved to Paris and began training at l'École de la rue Blanche. At this time, she met her future agent Chafika. She worked as a stage actor, on films such as Germinal and on television programmes such as Navarro.

She auditioned for the role of Angélique in Robert Hossein's 1995 play, based on the novels by Anne Golon, and subsequently performed 130 times at the Palais des Sports.

Bois starred in films such as Dakan, Ça n'empêche pas les sentiments, Lucky Punch, le montreur de boxe, and Le roi danse, but she has played greater roles on television.

She starred as the female lead in Agathe contre Agathe in 2007; in 2010, she acted alongside Bruno Wolkowitch and Florence Pernel in the television film Le Désamour, which was directed by Daniel Janneau for France 3.

Since 2013, she has played the title role in the France 2 series Candice Renoir.

For several years, Bois has been in a relationship with fellow actor Jean-Pierre Michaël, with whom she has two daughters. The couple married in 2016.

Filmography

Cinéma 

 1992: Promenades d'été 
 1993: Germinal 
 1993: La Place d'un autre
 1995: Lucky Punch, le montreur de boxe
 1996: Dakan
 1998: Ça n'empêche pas les sentiments 
 2000: Le roi danse 
 2000: Le Roman de Lulu
 2001: La Grande Vie !
 2004: Les Mots bleus
 2005: Une belle histoire
 2009: Trésor

Television 

 1993: Le Chasseur de la nuit
 1995: Navarro
 1995: Fils de flic
 1996: Les Alsaciens ou les Deux Mathilde
 1997: Une soupe aux herbes sauvages
 1997: La Maison d'Alexina
 1998: La Femme de l'Italien
 1998: Les monos (1 episode)
 2000: Maigret as Miss Vague (1 episode)
 2001: Résurrection
 2001: Mathieu Corot as Diane (1 episode) 
 2002: Femmes de loi as Vanessa (1 episode)
 2003: Une place parmi les vivants as Sabine
 2003: Je serai toujours près de toi as Guilaine
 2003: Joséphine, ange gardien as Sandrine (2 episode)
 2004: Ariane Ferry as Ariane Ferry
 2005: Sauveur Giordano as Caroline Lucas (1 episode)
 2005: Une famille formidable as Marie-Sophie (1 episode)
 2006: Agathe contre Agathe as Agathe Verdier
 2006: Tombé du ciel as Florence
 2006: Marie Besnard, l'empoisonneuse as Maître Chantal Jacquemin
 2007: Adresse inconnue as Isabelle Chanbrier(1 episode)
 2007: La vie à une as Elisa Moncea 
 2007: Camping Paradis as Julie (1 episode)
 2007: Cellule Identité as Frédéric
 2009: Vive les Vacances ! as Cécile (6 episodes)
 2009: Aveugle, mais pas trop as Ninon
 2009: Alice Nevers, le juge est une femme as Stéphanie Moreau (1 episode)
 2010: Le Désamour as Charlotte
 2010: Accusé Mendès France as Epouse lepretr 
 2011: Merci Patron as Nikki
 2013-present: Candice Renoir as Candice Renoir
 2014: Richelieu, la Pourpre et le Sang as Anne d'Autriche
 2015: Envers et contre tous as Audrey
 2017: Meurtres à Sarlat as Claire Dalmas (1 episode)

Stage 

 1990: Zapping, solitude, parloir
 1991: Volpon 
 1995: Angélique, marquise des anges
 2001: La Souricière d'Agatha Christie
 2008: Les Demoiselles d'Avignon

References 

French actresses
Conservatoire de Bordeaux alumni
1971 births
Living people